Pinchbeck railway station was a station in Pinchbeck, Lincolnshire, England on the line between Spalding and Sleaford. The station opened in 1882, closed to passengers in 1961 and closed entirely in 1964.

References

External links
 Pinchbeck station on navigable 1946 O. S. map

Disused railway stations in Lincolnshire
Former Great Northern and Great Eastern Joint Railway stations
Railway stations in Great Britain opened in 1882
Railway stations in Great Britain closed in 1961